Calocrater is a genus of plant in the family Apocynaceae first described as a genus in 1895. It contains only one known species, Calocrater preussii, native to central Africa (Cameroon, Gabon, Congo-Brazzaville).

References

Flora of Africa
Monotypic Apocynaceae genera
Rauvolfioideae